(The Breaking of the Ice on the River Oulu), Op. 30, is a composition by Jean Sibelius, an "improvisation for narrator, men's chorus and orchestra". Sibelius composed it in 1899 on a poem by Zachris Topelius, a Swedish-language Finnish poet, who had dedicated it to Tsar Alexander II of Russia, thus escaping censorship. The piece was an "explicit protest composition" against a Russia restricting the autonomy of the Grand Duchy of Finland. Sibelius wrote it for a lottery of the Savonian-Karelian Students' Association, where he conducted the first performance on 21October 1899.

Background and history 
Sibelius composed  in a political context. Most of what is now Finland had been part of Sweden until Russia won the territory in the Finnish War and ruled it as a Grand Duchy. It was first autonomous in terms of a parliament, money, and schools in Swedish and Finnish, but Nikolay Bobrikov, the Russian Governor-General, tried to limit these liberties and even proposed schooling only in Russian.

Sibelius conducted the first performance, the premiere. He used the choral theme again for children's choir a cappella, The Landscape Breathes (Nejden andas). After the first performance, Sibelius made a note about the composition, "should be revised", which he later did.

Composition 
The breaking of the ice is an annual event in some northern countries, releasing winter and ending immobility. The poem lists many rivers besides the one in the title, summarizing Finland. He dedicated it to Tsar Alexander II, thus protecting it from censorship. Sibelius, like the poet, interpreted the frozen river as a symbol of the Russian oppression, and the breaking of the ice as an image of freedom. Sibelius confirmed the underlying meaning of the music when he programmed its premiere to be followed by Song of the Athenians, a song for freedom first performed half a year earlier and held high by Finnish nationalists.

The composition is subtitled "improvisation for narrator, men's chorus and orchestra". The subtitle is Sibelius' own description of the work, it has otherwise been described as a melodrama, cantata and choir suite. It begins and ends with recitation for the narrator, accented by brass chords. The center of the work is a dramatic chorus, often in unison and accompanied by a symphony orchestra. It has been considered as a test piece for Finlandia in terms of accessibility and some effects of orchestration.

Notes

References

Literature 
 

Melodramas
Compositions by Jean Sibelius
1899 compositions
Compositions with a narrator
Finnish culture
Swedish culture